Andrew John Hozier-Byrne (born 17 March 1990), known mononymously as Hozier, is an Irish musician, singer, and songwriter. His music primarily draws from folk, soul, and blues, often using religious and literary themes. He had his international breakthrough after releasing his debut single "Take Me to Church", which has been certified multi-platinum in several countries.

Born and raised in County Wicklow, Hozier released his debut EP in 2013, featuring "Take Me to Church", which became a rock radio hit in the U.S. and peaked at number two on the Billboard Hot 100. His eponymous debut studio album was released in September 2014 to critical acclaim. It has been certified 6× platinum in Ireland and multi-platinum in several countries. In September 2018, he released an EP titled Nina Cried Power and featured the title track as a single, reaching number one on the Billboard Adult Alternative Songs chart. He released his second album Wasteland, Baby! in March 2019, which debuted atop the Irish Albums Chart and the Billboard 200, and has since been certified gold in the U.S.

Early life 
Andrew John Hozier-Byrne was born on 17 March 1990 in Bray, County Wicklow; the son of Raine Hozier-Byrne, an artist, and John Byrne, a local blues drummer who had a day job working at a bank. He grew up near Delgany, County Wicklow. As a child, Hozier self-identified as a "class clown" and an "unfocused student", calling school a "monotonous nightmare". He once worked a job scrubbing toilets at a golf course, which he described as a "good experience of hard work". He began writing songs at the age of 15. He taught himself guitar and sang in his school choir. He was educated at Delgany National School. His parents are members of the Quaker faith. Despite this, he later attended the Catholic St. Gerard's School before studying music education at Trinity College Dublin. He was refused a year's deferral by the college after missing exams to record demos for a music label.

Career

2008–2012: Beginnings
While at Trinity, Hozier became involved with the Trinity Orchestra. He was a member of the choral ensemble Anúna from 2007 to 2012 and appears as a soloist on their 2014 release Illuminations singing "La Chanson de Mardi Gras". He toured and sang with the group internationally including performances in Norway and the Netherlands. Hozier played at Oxegen Festival in 2009 and 2010. In 2011, he opened up for a performance for Alex Winston in Dublin. In 2012, Hozier appeared as a backup singer for Billy Ocean.

2013–2017: Breakthrough

Hozier wrote the song "Take Me to Church" in 2013 in between playing open mic nights in Dublin; the rough demo resulted in him signing with indie label Rubyworks Records. Hozier released his debut extended play, also called Take Me to Church, on 3 July 2013. It appeared on the Billboard 200. He initially recorded track demos in his attic studio before working on the record with producer Rob Kirwan. The titular single was released in September 2013. The music video, alluding to themes of homophobia, was released that same month, having been created on a "shoestring budget" and filmed entirely in black-and-white. The video was shared by English actor Stephen Fry, which helped it reach the front page of Reddit and subsequently go viral. "Take Me to Church" saw Hozier's rise to prominence, with the song scoring top five positions around the world and gaining multi-platinum certifications; the song also garnered critical acclaim for its lyricism and messaging. The EP's concluding track, "Cherry Wine", appeared in Zach Braff's movie Wish I Was Here, chosen for its "heartbreaking lyrics and poetry". It was later performed on the Late Late Show. In 2014, Hozier released his second EP, From Eden.

Hozier released his eponymous album, Hozier, on 19 September 2014, including tracks from his first two extended-play albums (EPs). The album drew inspiration from folk, R&B, and blues music. Hozier met critical success; Helen Brown of The Telegraph noted that it was "an intense, youthful lyrical tangling of religion and romantic obsession that regularly finds him poised 'between love and abuse'". Hozier peaked at number one in Ireland and finished second on the US Billboard 200. The album is certified 2× platinum in the UK and US. After the release of "Take Me to Church", the record released five singles released from 2014 to 2016: "From Eden", "Sedated", "Work Song", Someone New", "Jackie and Wilson", and "Cherry Wine", which all appeared on the Irish Singles Chart. The music videos for "From Eden" "Someone New" and "Cherry Wine" featured actresses Katie McGrath, Natalie Dormer and Saoirse Ronan, respectively. He embarked on an American and European tour to support the album.

"Take Me to Church" was later nominated at the 57th Annual Grammy Awards for Song of the Year in 2015. At the awards show, he performed the song with Annie Lennox, and later at the 2015 Billboard Music Awards. On 12 November 2015, he won the VH1 Artist of the Year, a fan-voted award. At the ceremony, he performed "Take Me to Church" and The Beatles' "Blackbird" with singer Tori Kelly. In June 2016, Hozier released the song "Better Love" as part of the Legend of Tarzan soundtrack. Hozier subsequently took a one-year hiatus from his work, moving back to Ireland to "reconnect" after touring his debut album.

2018–2021: Nina Cried Power EP and Wasteland, Baby! 

In September 2018, Hozier returned with the release of the extended-play album Nina Cried Power. The record features a collaboration with Mavis Staples on the titular track. He released his second studio album's lead single, "Movement", on 14 November 2018, alongside a music video. Hozier's second album, Wasteland, Baby!, was released on 1 March 2019, including tracks from his previous EP. The thematic elements of the album center around his interpretation of the apocalypse while looking for thematic elements of romance and redemption. Reviews were largely positive; Elisabeth Woronzoff of PopMatters stated it "light[s] the artist's skill and vision of his craft... [and] that it [..] delivers while edifying the artist as an impactful voice in the art and activism sphere." The album debuted atop the Irish Albums Chart and the Billboard 200, Hozier's first number-one US release. Wasteland Baby! has since been certified silver in the United Kingdom and gold in the United States.

After Wasteland, Baby! release, Hozier embarked on a worldwide tour across North America, Australia, New Zealand, and Europe to promote the album. Wasteland, Baby! released two further singles released in 2019 that debuted on the Irish Singles Chart: "Almost (Sweet Music)" and "Dinner and Diatribes"; the music video for the latter track features an appearance from actress Anya Taylor-Joy. He was the closing headliner of the inaugural Railbird Festival held on the grounds of the Keeneland horse track in Lexington, Kentucky. Hozier was one of the headliners for the Electric Picnic 2019, a three-day festival held in Ireland on 30 August to 1 September. He performed at the Glastonbury Festival 2019, a five-day festival held in June in England. He also performed at the Lollapalooza 2019, a four-day music festival held in Chicago in August.

In March and April 2020, Hozier did multiple live-streamed performances on social media platforms Instagram and Facebook to raise money and awareness for the Irish Society for the Prevention of Cruelty to Children (ISPCC) during the COVID-19 pandemic. On 27 March, he performed on the Late Late Show. On 14 April, he announced that he was releasing his cover of "The Parting Glass" for streaming on all platforms, with proceeds going to the ISPCC. On 26 June 2020, he participated in an RTÉ fundraising special, RTÉ Does Comic Relief, with proceeds going towards victims of the COVID-19 pandemic. For the special, he performed a cover of "Bridge over Troubled Water" in Croke Park and performed a sketch with Irish comedian Aisling Bea.

On 29 October 2021, Hozier released the single "Tell It to My Heart" in collaboration with Meduza, which debuted at number 13 on the Irish Singles Chart.

2022–present: Unreal Unearth and Eat Your Young EP 
On 31 December 2021, Hozier announced his upcoming album, stating on Twitter "Unreal Unearth will start to find its way to your ears next year, come hell or high water". He has released snippets of lyrics from two upcoming songs on social media, "De Selby" and "Rob the Goddess". He released the single "Swan Upon Leda" on 7 October 2022, with its inspiration coming from Egyptian feminist Mona Eltahawy, as well as the Dobbs decision in the United States and the 2022 Mahsa Amini protests in Iran. Atwood Magazine praised the song as "a haunting and heartbreakingly beautiful prayer, plea, and cry for reproductive rights and women’s empowerment." "Blood Upon the Snow" was released on 9 November 2022, as a collaboration with composer Bear McCreary for the video game God of War Ragnarök. On March 16, 2023, Hozier announced the Unreal Earth album tour. He released the extended play Eat Your Young on March 17, 2023. The EP features three songs: "Eat Your Young", "All Things End", and "Through Me (The Flood)".

Artistry

Influences

As a result of his countryside upbringing, many of Hozier's early music exposure came from his parents' blues, jazz, and soul record collections, incorporating artists like John Lee Hooker, Muddy Waters, Bukka White, and Tom Waits. His first musical memories were drawn from his father's career as a drummer playing music in Dublin. He has stated that his musical education was "grounded" in Chicago blues artists such as John Lee Hooker, Otis Redding, and Nina Simone, to whom he pays tribute in the track "Nina Cried Power". As a child, he was a fan of the bands Stereophonics and Daft Punk. His draws inspiration primarily from Irish and African-American artistry; he has said that the "roots" of jazz, rock, soul, and R&B have been largely shaped by black culture and finds importance in "crediting the legacy you're crediting". His guitar work draws from Celtic folk inspiration, as well as musicians Ali Farka Toure and Tinariwen. Hozier has stated that "the best vocalists I can think of are female". Musically, Hozier has listed Aretha Franklin, Johnny Cash, Woody Guthrie, Van Morrison, Ella Fitzgerald, St Vincent, Feist, Little Green Cars, Paul Simon, Willie Dixon, and Lisa Hannigan as musical and vocal influences.

Songwriting
Hozier states that his writing differs based on the starting point; varying from a couplet and lyrical idea, or a musical hook that he "flesh[es] out from a fairly embryonic point". Lyrics "by far take [him] the most time", describing a "slow process of repetition" while "not lean[ing] too much on verbose phrases" to maintain the integrity of the sentiment. His process is described as "slow, methodical work" and he is "meticulous" about wording; he has stated that he "can defend any idea by the time someone hears it, because [he has] put it through a strainer seven times". His lyrics often contain vivid literary references and draw imagery from nature and religion; they tend to focus on themes of romantic relationships, love, and politics. Hozier has dismissed comparisons of his work to poetry, stating that to consider it such "would be a disservice to poetry itself." The "subversion of social norms" plays a role in his music, which often discuss the defiance of organised religion and social convention. Hozier references the Irish concept of the craic, which he interprets as subverting social norms and self-respect, and has stated, "If the Irish are not taking the piss out of something, what's the point really?" His songwriting has been influenced by Irish music and folklore, as well as poets Seamus Heaney and W. B. Yeats. He has said that his first record contained a "fairytale aspect" influenced by Oscar Wilde.

Steve Baltin of Forbes observed that Hozier's brief collegiate study of music theory has influenced his sound as he writes from "socially conscious" perspective. Hozier has stated that he believes "the personal is the political"; much of his work holds direct references to topical events. The "Take Me to Church" music video features two men in a same-sex relationship, and highlights the injustices and violence perpetrated against members of the LGBT community. The video was inspired by videos of violent crimes against gay men in Russia. The music video for the song "Cherry Wine" was released to raise awareness of domestic violence. "Nina Cried Power" is a song that highlights artists such as Nina Simone, Bob Dylan, and Mavis Staples whose work takes a political or social justice stance. The music video features Irish activists alongside protest footage. "Be" also contains many allusions to sea level rise and refugee crises, referencing President Donald Trump and The Apprentice. In November 2019, Hozier released a song titled "Jackboot Jump", following live performances of it on tour. This song, besides being a direct reference to George Orwell's 1984, alludes to social demonstrations in Hong Kong, Russia and in America. In 2019, Hozier performed an unreleased song whilst on tour entitled "But the Wages" that refers to temperatures rising as well as riots all around the world, while wages remain the same.

Activism
Hozier is part of Home Sweet Home, an organisation led by Irish celebrities including actress Saoirse Ronan and musician Glen Hansard. In 2016, the organisation illegally took over an office building in Dublin to house 31 homeless families. Hozier, who had a Protestant upbringing in the Quaker faith but also attended a Catholic school, is an outspoken critic of the Catholic Church. He showed support for the Irish abortion referendum, and stated he felt "pride" in his generation and the democratic process following the vote. On 5 June 2020, he announced that all royalties from his song "Jackboot Jump" would go to the NAACP and Black Lives Matter movement following the George Floyd protests. On May 22, 2021, Hozier signed an open letter calling for Irish Americans in President Joe Biden's cabinet to stand with Palestinians.

Personal life
Hozier continues to reside in Ireland. He has the last words of Irish poet Seamus Heaney tattooed on his arm ("noli timere", Latin for "don't be afraid"). Hozier was raised in the Protestant Quaker faith, and now identifies as an agnostic. While he admitted in 2019 that he rarely attends church except for funerals and weddings, he admires the Quaker religion for its pacifism and its anti-war sentiment. He is especially interested in how people use religious institutions to claim "infallibility" in order to gain control and power over others. He had stated that one positive lesson he learned from his religious upbringing was to "look for the spark of the divine in every individual" and treat everybody as if "you are looking into the mind and face of God".

Discography

Studio albums

Extended plays

Singles

As lead artist

As featured artist

Other charted songs

Notes

Awards and nominations
American Music Awards

|-
|rowspan="1"|2015
|Hozier
|Favorite Alternative Artist
|

ARIA Music Awards

|-
|2015
|Hozier
|Best International Artist 
|

BBC Music Awards

|-
|rowspan=2|2015
|Hozier
|International Artist of the Year
|
|-
|"Take Me to Church"
| Song of the Year
| 

Billboard Music Awards

|-
|rowspan="5"|2015
|rowspan="2"|Hozier
|Top New Artist
|
|-
|Top Rock Artist
|
|-
|rowspan="2"|"Take Me to Church"
|Top Streaming Song 
|
|-
|Top Rock Song
|
|-
|Hozier
|Top Rock Album
|

Country Music Association Awards

|-
|2020
|"The Bones" (with Maren Morris)
|Musical Event of the Year
|

European Border Breakers Awards

|-
|2015
|Hozier
|Album of the Year
|

Denmark GAFFA Awards

!Ref.
|-
| rowspan=2|2020
| Hozier
| Best Foreign Solo Act 
| 
| rowspan=2|
|-
|Wasteland, Baby!
|Best Foreign Album 
| 

Grammy Awards

|-
|2015
|"Take Me to Church"
|Song of the Year
|

Ivor Novello Awards

|-
| 2015
| "Take Me to Church"
| rowspan="2"|Best Song Musically and Lyrically
| 
|-
| 2019
| "Nina Cried Power"
| 

iHeartRadio Music Awards

!Ref.
|-
| 2020
| "The Bones" (with Maren Morris)
| Best Remix
| 
| 

Juno Awards

|-
|2016
|Hozier
|International Album of the Year
|

Los Premios 40 Principales

|-
|rowspan=2|2015
|Hozier
|Best International New Artist
| rowspan="2" 
|-
|"Take Me to Church"
|Best International Video
|-

MTV Europe Music Awards

|-
|2014
|"Take Me to Church"
|Best Song with a Social Message
|

MTV Video Music Awards

|-
|rowspan="2"|2015
|rowspan="2"|"Take Me to Church"
|Best Rock Video
| rowspan="2" 
|-
|Best Direction

Silver Clef Award

!Ref.
|-
| 2016
| Hozier
| International Award
| 
|

Teen Choice Awards

|-
|2015
|"Take Me to Church"
|Choice Rock Song
|

Žebřík Music Awards

!Ref.
|-
| rowspan=2|2014
| Hozier
| Best International Discovery
| 
| rowspan=2|
|-
| "Take Me to Church"
| Best International Song
|

Notes

References

External links 

 
 

1990 births
Living people
21st-century Irish male singers
Alumni of Trinity College Dublin
Critics of the Catholic Church
Former Quakers
Irish agnostics
Irish blues singers
Irish rock singers
Irish male singer-songwriters
Irish LGBT rights activists
People educated at St Gerard's School, Bray
People from Bray, County Wicklow
Soul singers